Thomas “Tommy” Massengale Battle Jr. (born December 3, 1955) is an American businessman and politician who serves as the 67th and current mayor of Huntsville, Alabama. His first term began November 3, 2008, and he has since been reelected in 2012, 2016, and most recently in 2020.

Early life and education
Battle was born in Birmingham, Alabama, on December 3, 1955. When he was 14 years old, he had his first job working for his father's restaurant. Battle went to Berry High School (now Hoover High).

Battle later attended the University of Alabama, in Tuscaloosa, to study business. He participated in the Student Government Association and the debate team. Battle later joined the Alabama Republican Party. In 1975, Battle became the chairman of the university's College Republicans, and later the Alabama College Republicans.

After graduating college and holding a B.S. degree in business, Battle became a manager for Britling on the Highland in Birmingham, which he later sold. Battle later moved to Huntsville in 1980, becoming a local real estate developer, and was elected and served one term on the city council as the council's finance chair from 1984 to 1988. During this time, he met Eula, and his son Andrew was born. Battle left the council to run for the mayor's office, losing in a tight run-off against Democratic candidate Steve Hettinger in 1988.

After the election loss, Battle started Battle Real Estate and owned or became a management partner in several firms in the retail and real estate sectors.

Political career

Mayoral elections

2008 election 
Battle announced his mayoral candidacy against incumbent Loretta Spencer on March 26, 2008. Battle's policies were fiscal responsibility, free enterprise, education, and creating jobs. Prior to the first round of voting, Spencer was endorsed by The Huntsville Times. The Committee of 100, a group of businesspeople, issued a joint endorsement of Battle and Spencer.

In the municipal election on August 26, 2008, Spencer led Battle by 14,871 votes to 14,486. However, two minor candidates received 673 votes, preventing Spencer from attaining a majority, forcing a runoff with Battle. In the runoff, on October 7, 2008, Battle  defeated Spencer, by a vote of 21,123 votes (56%) to 16,821 (44%) for Spencer.

2012 election 
On August 28, 2012, Battle won with 81 percent of the vote, beating Loretta Spencer and Jackie Reed. The 2012 election had the largest margin of victory in a Huntsville mayoral election. The voting results were as follows:
 Battle: 22,838 (80.7%)
 Spencer: 4,312 (15.2%)
 Reed: 1,159 (4.1%)

He won in all 44 precincts citywide.

2016 election 
On September 23, 2015, Battle posted a statement confirming his running for a third term as mayor in 2016. Battle later won against his opponents, with 80% of the votes cast for him.
 Battle: 13,896 (80.7%)
 Spencer: 1,516 (8.8%)
 Reed: 1,799 (10.5%)

2020 election

On August 25, 2020, Battle won reelection with 77.61% of the vote.

Battle: 21,589 (77.61%)
 Woloszyn: 2,894 (10.40%)
 Reed: 1,729 (6.22%)
 Shingleton: 1,607 (5.78%)

Mayor of Huntsville 
During his second term, Battle, working with the State of Alabama, began the Restore Our Roads campaign and received a $250 million roads package designed to pay for necessary roadwork as well as increase economic development. To help fund the development further, a one-cent sales tax increase was proposed by Battle. The city council unanimously approved the increase and Huntsville saw the $453 million construction project grow to fruition.

In 2015, Battled pushed the City of Huntsville to buy body cameras for the Huntsville Police Department, costing tax payers 1.2 million dollars.

In 2016, Battle announced that Google Fiber was coming to Huntsville, a move Battle strongly supported.

Battle favored the expansion of ridesharing companies such as Uber and Lyft into the city and rewrote the vehicle for hire ordinance to make clear such companies could operate there.

In the December 2017 special election for the Senate, Battle endorsed former State Supreme Court Judge Roy Moore, stating "As a Republican, we were going to support whoever the Republican party nominated during our primary. The Republicans nominated Roy Moore."

In April 2018, a rookie Huntsville Police officer, William Darby, shot and killed a suicidal man within 11 seconds of arriving at a call. In August 2018, Mayor Battle urged the Huntsville city council to pay or assist with paying for Darby's defense. The city paid $89,000 for his defense. In May 2020, Darby was found guilty of murder. After the verdict, Battle released a statement that says he "disagree with the verdict" and that "Officer Darby followed the appropriate safety protocols in his response on the scene." Darby was cleared of wrong-doing by the city police review board. As a result, Darby was still being paid by the city of Huntsville until late July. On August 20, 2021, Darby was sentenced to 25 years in jail for the murder. Battle pushed to prevent the bodycam footage from being released. However, the footage of the murder was released on August 27, 2021.

Fifteen Huntsville-area organizations, including the Alabama chapters of Southern Christian Leadership Conference and NAACP Youth Council, have denounced Mayor Battle's handling of the George Floyd protest that occurred in and around Big Spring Park on June 3, 2020. Huntsville Police along with SWAT and Incident Response Team used tear gas, pepper spray, and rubber bullets to end the protest.

Controversy 
Following the murder conviction of William Darby, political groups and politicians have called for Battle to resign. Locals have also started an online petition calling for Battle's resignation along with Huntsville Police Chief Mark McMurray.

In May 2021, a Huntsville civil rights group, Rosa Parks Day Committee, called for Battle's resignation along with Police Chief Mark McMurray. This came after both men publicly supported Huntsville Police Officer William Darby after a jury found him guilty of murder, the office William Derby, was sentenced to 25 years. Mark McMurray announced his retirement in Feb 2022.

2018 gubernatorial election 

Battle unsuccessfully ran for the Republican nomination for governor of Alabama in 2018 as an "outsider" candidate; he lost in the Republican primary to incumbent Kay Ivey.

Battle has touted strong job growth under his tenure, as well as the city's top credit rating from credit rating agencies.

Personal life 
Battle married Eula Sammons, a kindergarten teacher at Monrovia Elementary, in 1988; they have one son, Andrew Battle, and two grandsons. Sammons died on October 20, 2020.

Battle is a member of the Trinity United Methodist Church.

References

External links
 Tommy Battle for Mayor official website
 City of Huntsville website: Official Biography

1955 births
Living people
Alabama city council members
Alabama Republicans
Mayors of Huntsville, Alabama
21st-century American politicians
Politicians from Birmingham, Alabama